Emin Gün Sirer is a Turkish-American computer scientist. Sirer developed the Avalanche Consensus protocol underlying the Avalanche blockchain platform, and is currently the CEO and co-founder of Ava Labs. He was an associate professor of computer science at Cornell University, and is the former co-director of The Initiative for Cryptocurrencies and Smart Contracts (IC3). He is known for his contributions to peer-to-peer systems, operating systems and computer networking.

Education
Emin Gün Sirer attended high school at Robert College, received his undergraduate degree in computer science at Princeton University, and finished his graduate studies at the University of Washington. He received his Ph.D. in Computer Science and Engineering in 2002 under the supervision of Brian N. Bershad.

Career
Prior to his appointment as a professor at Cornell University, Sirer worked at AT&T Bell Labs on Plan 9, at DEC SRC, and at NEC.

Sirer is known for his contributions to operating systems, distributed systems, and fundamental cryptocurrency research. He co-developed the SPIN (operating system), where the implementation and interface of an operating system could be modified at run-time by type-safe extension code. He also led the Nexus OS effort, where he developed new techniques for attesting to and reasoning about the semantic properties of remote programs.

Cryptocurrency
Karma is a virtual currency for peer-to-peer systems, introduced by Sirer and co-authors in 2003. It is designed to eliminate the free-loader problem, i.e. preventing malicious users from consuming resources without giving anything in return. It is the first peer-to-peer currency with a distributed mint.

Sirer and Ittay Eyal wrote and published the paper "Majority is not Enough, Bitcoin Mining is Vulnerable" which describes the selfish mining attack, an attack on Bitcoin which is profitable even for an attacker with only 33% of total hash power, which is less than the 50% required by the original security analysis in Satoshi Nakamoto's Bitcoin whitepaper. Sirer, Eyal, and other co-authors developed Bitcoin-NG, a bitcoin scaling solution, and Bitcoin Covenants, a security solution. 

Sirer is also co-founder of bloXroute, a company offering a solution to the scalability bottleneck of the Layer-0 network layer. In 2020 he was the co-director of IC3, the Initiative for Cryptocurrency And Contracts.

Avalanche protocol
Sirer led development of the Avalanche Consensus protocol, and its native token, AVAX. The Avalanche project was incubated at Cornell University, where Emin Gün Sirer was assisted by PhD candidates Maofan Yin and Kevin Sekniqi. Ava Labs is a technology company founded by Sirer in 2019, with the express purpose of developing an alternative blockchain technology for the financial sector.

Awards
Brilliant-10 by Popular Science
National Science Foundation CAREER Award

Patents
"A Process for Rewriting Executable Content on a Network Server or Desktop Machine in Order to Enforce Site-Specific Properties." Emin Gun Sirer and Brian N. Bershad. US Patent #6865735, issued February 3, 2005.

See also
List of people in blockchain technology

References

External links 
 
 Official Blog

Living people
People associated with cryptocurrency
American people of Turkish descent
Turkish American
American computer scientists
Turkish computer scientists
Robert College alumni
Princeton University alumni
University of Washington alumni
Cornell University faculty
Year of birth missing (living people)